Robert William Boyle (October 2, 1883 – April 18, 1955) was a physicist and one of the most important early pioneers in the development of sonar.

Boyle was born in 1883 at Carbonear in the Dominion of Newfoundland.  Boyle left Newfoundland for Montreal, Quebec in Canada where he trained at McGill University under Nobel Prize winner Sir Ernest Rutherford, in the then fledgling field of radioactivity.  He earned McGill's first Doctor of Philosophy in physics in 1909. He then moved to England to continue his work by following Rutherford to the University of Manchester.

In 1912 he returned to Canada at the request of Henry Marshall Tory to become head of the physics department at the University of Alberta, and shifted his research to ultrasonics.

During the First World War Boyle volunteered his expertise to the British Admiralty and, with the help of his old professor Ernest Rutherford, he joined the Board of Inventions and Research and worked with British physicist Albert Beaumont Wood, a fellow student of Rutherford's.

Before 1917 the scientific teams from the Allied countries worked separately, however, after joining forces with French researchers, Boyle produced a working prototype of what the British called "ASDIC" (the first sonar).

Early versions of the technology were being installed on Royal Navy war ships just as the war came to an end.

In 1919 Boyle returned to Alberta and shortly thereafter became dean of the Faculty of Applied Science, a position he held until 1929.  That year he joined the National Research Council of Canada as the director of physics, where he supervised research into radar during the Second World War.

He continued to work at the National Research Council until his retirement in 1948, when he moved back to England.

He was elected to the Royal Society of Canada in 1921 and awarded the Flavelle Medal in 1940.  He died in London, England, aged 71.

References

External links
Early Sonar Developed by UofA Engineering Professor
 University of Alberta People: Robert Boyle

1883 births
1955 deaths
Academics of the Victoria University of Manchester
Canadian academics in engineering
Canadian physicists
Fellows of the Royal Society of Canada
McGill University Faculty of Science alumni
People from Carbonear
Pre-Confederation Newfoundland and Labrador people
Academic staff of the University of Alberta